Giaglione is a comune (municipality) in the Metropolitan City of Turin in the Italian region Piedmont, located about  west of Turin, on the border with France.

Giaglione borders the following municipalities: Bramans (France), Chiomonte, Exilles, Gravere, Mompantero, Susa, and Venaus. It is home to the scanty remains of a castle and to a chapel housing 15th-century frescoes.

Twin towns — sister cities
Giaglione is twinned with:

  Bramans, France (2010)

References

External links
 Official website

Cities and towns in Piedmont